Abdul Latif Tibawi (1910–1981) was a Palestinian historian and educationalist.

Biography
Born in Taybet El-Muthalath, near TulKarem, he was one of the earliest graduates of the Arabic College, Dar Al-Mu’allimin, in Jerusalem. He read history and Arabic literature at the American University of Beirut and later earned a Ph.D from the University of London in 1948. Prior to the 1948 Palestinian exodus he was a senior education officer in Jerusalem. He was in London when the crisis of 1948 unfolded. He became a refugee and was appointed Lecturer in Comparative Education at the Institute of Education, London, where he taught until his retirement in 1977. Tibawi wrote extensively on many aspects of Middle Eastern history in both English and Arabic.

He established a fund for Palestinian postgraduate students at the School of Oriental and African Studies.

Select bibliography
Arab Education In Mandatory Palestine, Luzac, 1956
Jerusalem; Its Place in Islam and Arab History, Institute for Palestinian Studies, 1969
British Interests In Palestine, 1800-1901, Oxford University Press, 1961
  Anglo-Arab Relations and The Question of Palestine, 1914-1921; Luzac, 1977
A Modern History of Syria, Including Lebanon and Palestine, Macmillan, St Martin's P., 1969
American interests In Syria, 1800-1901, Clarendon Press, 1966
Islamic Education: Its Traditions and Modernization into the Arab National Systems, Luzac, 1972
The Islamic Pious Foundations in Jerusalem: Origins, History and Usurpation by Israel, London, 1978

References
http://www.palestine-studies.org/
http://www.allamaiqbal.com/publications/journals/review/apr00/20.htm

1910 births
1981 deaths
20th-century Palestinian historians
Palestinian refugees
Palestinian emigrants to the United Kingdom
Academics of the UCL Institute of Education